William Shirley Fulton, (November 23, 1880 – November 20, 1964), an archeologist and founder of the Amerind Foundation was born in Waterbury, Connecticut. He received a Bachelor of Arts degree from Yale University in 1903.

Biography
Several trips to Arizona between 1906 and 1917 permanently captured his interest in the archaeology and ethnology of the American southwest. Throughout the 1920s Fulton regularly traveled in the Arizona from his home in New England, exploring the mountains, as well as the canyons and mesa country seeking evidence of past occupation by earlier cultures that had inhabited the area.

On one of his visits he was introduced to Texas Canyon with its unique geology and tales of prehistoric settlements. He built a home in the canyon in 1931.

As early as 1929, Fulton began to excavate archaeological sites on the property in Arizona. Fulton was asked to become a director of the Museum of the American Indian, Heye Foundation in New York City in 1934, and it was under the auspices of this organization that he published his Archaeological Notes on Texas Canyon, Arizona. By 1936, Fulton’s collection of ethnographic and archaeological materials had become so large that a small three-room museum and workroom was built on the ranch property to house it.

With the establishment of the Amerind Foundation in 1937, Fulton became fully committed to supporting research into North America's prehistoric past.

With Fulton as director, and with his generous financial support, the Amerind Foundation continued to expand. The Amerind Foundation sponsored several major archaeological excavations in the Southwest and northern Mexico throughout the 1950s, resulting in a number of publications, and in 1959, the Fulton-Hayden Memorial Library and Art Museum became the most recent addition to the burgeoning Amerind Foundation's facilities.

Awards
In 1959 the University of Arizona awarded Fulton the honorary degree of Doctor of Science. The citation read in part:

In 1960, in honor of his work in the field of archaeology, Fulton received an honorary Doctorate of Humane Letters from Yale University in recognition of his lifelong commitment to archaeological research. An excerpt from that award reads:

The William Shirley Fulton Scholarship
William Shirley Fulton, pioneer Arizona archaeologist and founder of the Amerind Foundation of Dragoon, Arizona, bequeathed the William Shirley Fulton Scholarship. The candidate must be an outstanding undergraduate or graduate student in archaeology. University of Arizona candidates are nominated by the Department of Anthropology subject to the approval of the Dean of the College of Social and Behavioral Sciences and the Office of Student Financial Aid.

External links
 
Amerind Foundation

1880 births
1964 deaths
People from Cochise County, Arizona
People from Waterbury, Connecticut
20th-century American archaeologists
Historians from Connecticut